Bangladesh Betar Traffic Broadcasting, commonly known as Traffic FM, is a Bangladesh Betar-owned radio station broadcasting on  88.8 FM in Dhaka, Bangladesh. It is the oldest FM radio station in Bangladesh, launched on May 26, 2005.

References

External links
 Website

Radio stations in Bangladesh